William Harrison Quealy (March 11, 1913 – September 29, 1993) was a judge of the United States Tax Court from 1969 to 1980.

Early life and education
Born in New Orleans, Louisiana to William I. and Elizabeth H. Quealy of that city, Quealy's father was a banker whose business brought the family to Havana, Cuba, where Quealy attended the Colegio de LaSalle.

Quealy also attended Springhill High School in Mobile, Alabama, and Georgetown Preparatory School in Garrett Park, Maryland.

He received an A.B. from the Georgetown University College of Arts and Sciences, cum laude, in 1933 and an LL.B. from the Georgetown University Law Center in 1937.

Legal career and military service
Quealy gained admission to the bar in 1936. From 1942 to 1945, he served in the United States military, first as company officer with the United States Army 57th Infantry Regiment in the Asiatic-Pacific theater of World War II, Towards the end of the war, he served as a negotiator on the Detroit Renegotiation Board for United States Air Force Material Command. He left the service with the rank of captain.

Outside of this service, he was a practicing tax attorney in Washington, D.C., and Chicago, Illinois, from 1936 to 1962. He then served as minority counsel for the United States House Committee on Ways and Means from 1962 to 1969.

Quealy was appointed to the United States Tax Court by President Richard Nixon in 1969, taking his oath of office as judge on that court on October 1, 1969, for a term expiring June 1, 1987. He served until 1980, when he retired, thereafter moving to Florida.

Personal life and death
In 1940, Quealy married Betty Alice Shallberg of Moline, Illinois, with whom he had three daughters and one son.

Quealy died of cardiac arrest at his home in Amelia Island, Florida, at the age of 80.

References

1913 births
1993 deaths
People from New Orleans

Judges of the United States Tax Court
United States Article I federal judges appointed by Richard Nixon
Georgetown University alumni
Georgetown University Law Center alumni
United States Army personnel of World War II